Blanca is a feminine Spanish given name. Notable people with the name include:

Blanca of Navarre (disambiguation), the name of various members of the aristocracy
Infanta Blanca of Spain (1868–1949), Archduchess and Princess of Austria and Princess of Hungary, Bohemia, and Tuscany by marriage
Blanca de la Cerda y Lara (c. 1317–1347), Spanish noblewoman
Blanca Delia Pérez, Spanish politician of the Canary Islands
Blanca Alcalá, Mexican politician
Blanca Canales (1906–1996), Puerto Rican nationalist leader
Blanca Castellón (born 1958), Nicaraguan poet
Blanca Eekhout (born 1968), Venezuelan politician
Blanca Errázuriz (1894–1940), Chilean woman acquitted of the murder of her husband
Blanca Heredia, Miss Venezuela 1956
Blanca Lewin (born 1974), Chilean actress
Blanca Osuna (born 1950), Argentine politician
Blanca Ovelar (born 1957), Paraguayan politician and former Minister of Education
Blanca Estela Pavón (1926–1949), Mexican film actress
Blanca Portillo (born 1963), Spanish actress
Blanca Rodriguez (born 1927), First Lady of Venezuela (1974–1979, 1989–1993)
Blanca Rosa Vilchez, Hispanic journalist
Blanca Suárez, a Spanish actress
Blanca Callahan, Puerto Rican-born American singer; former member of Christian Pop duo Group 1 Crew

See also 
Blanka (given name), a feminine given name
Bianca, a feminine given name
Bianka, a feminine given name
Branca, a feminine given name
Branka, a feminine given name

Spanish feminine given names